Ivete Lucas is a filmmaker, documentarian, producer, editor, and director based in Austin, Texas. Her work includes the documentary short films The Curse and the Jubilee, The Send-Off, Roadside Attraction, The Rabbit Hunt, Skip Day, Happiness is a Journey and the documentary feature film Pahokee.

Her 2018 documentary short film, Skip Day won the Illy Prize at the 2018 Cannes Film Festival Directors' Fortnight among other awards. Her 2019 feature film Pahokee premiered at the 2019 Sundance Film Festival.

Early life
Ivete Lucas was born in Brazil and grew up in Mexico. She attended the Universidad de Monterrey where she received a BA in communication science. She received her MFA in film and video production at the University of Texas at Austin in 2012. Her filmmaking career was kickstarted by a grant she received from the Mexican Film Institute.

Film career
In 2012, Ivete served as co-director, co-producer, and editor on the short documentary film The Curse and the Jubilee. The film is about a small Appalachian mining town in Ivanhoe, Virginia. The film follows a Fourth of July celebration in the town.

In 2016, Ivete served as co-director and editor on the short documentary film The Send-Off. The film follows a group of students on their prom night. The film premiered in the United States at the 2016 Sundance Film Festival and internationally at the 2016 British Film Institute Film Festival. The film won the Texas Shorts competition at the 2016 South by Southwest Film Festival. The film won the Golden Gate Award for Short Films in the Documentary Short Category at the 2016 San Francisco International Film Festival.

In 2017, Ivete served as co-director, co-producer, and editor on the short documentary film Roadside Attraction. The film follows people flocking to the Palm Beach International Airport to take photos of a famous airplane. The film premiered internationally at the Toronto International Film Festival and in the United States at the South by Southwest Film Festival.

In 2017, Ivete served as editor on the short documentary film The Rabbit Hunt. The film follows a family hunting rabbits in the Florida Everglades. The film premiered in the United States at the 2017 Sundance Film Festival and Internationally at the 2017 Berlin International Film Festival. The film won many awards including the 2017 Cinema Eye Honor for Outstanding Achievement in Nonfiction Short Filmmaking, The 2017 BFI London International Film Festival Short Film Award, the 2017 South by Southwest Grand Jury Award, the 2017 San Francisco International Film Festival Golden Gate Award, the 2017 RMIT University for Best Documentary Short Film at the Melbourne International Film Festival, the Short Doc award at the Sheffield Doc/Fest, the 2017 Vienna International Short Film Festival Best Short Film and Best Documentary Short Film, the Silver Hugo Award at the 2017 Chicago International Film Festival, a Special Mention at the 2017 Art Film Festival (Slovakia), the Environmental Rights Center Bellona Award at the 2017 Message to Men International Film Festival (Russia), the Grand Jury Award for Best Documentary Short at the 2017 Florida Film Festival, The Festival Silhouette Grand Jury Prize and Documentary Jury Prize, the Nitehawk Shorts Festival Festival Jury Award, the 2017 Greenwich Film Festival Best Documentary Short, the 2017 New Hampshire International Film Festival Shorts Jury Award - Documentary, the 2017 Las Vegas Film Festival Best Documentary award, The 2017 Rural Route Film Festival Best Documentary, the 2017 Y'allywood Film Festival Best Documentary, the 2017 Vimeo Staff Pick of the Week and Staff Pick of the Month, and the 2017 Vimeo Short of the Week Best Short Documentary of the Year. The film was a nominee for the International Documentary Association Short Film Award.

In 2018, Ivete served as co-director, co-producer, and editor on the short documentary film Skip Day. The film follows a group of Florida teenagers celebrating their high school skip day. The film premiered internationally at the 2018 Directors' Fortnight at the Cannes Film Festival and went on to screen at over forty other film festivals. The film won the 2018 Cannes Film Festival Directors' Fortnight Short Film Prize, the 2018 Denver Film Festival Best Documentary Short, the 2018 Curta Cinema Rio de Janeiro Directing Award, the 2018 Docs en Court Grand Prix, the 2018 Y'allywood Best Short Doc, and the Vimeo Staff Pick of the Month. The film was nominated for the 2018 Cinema Eye Honor Outstanding Achievement in Nonfiction Short Filmmaking.

In 2019 Ivete served as co-director, co-producer, and editor of her first feature film, Pahokee. The film follows a group of small-town Florida high school students as they navigate their senior year in high school. The film premiered in the United States at the 2019 Sundance Film Festival and internationally at the Visions Du Reel Documentary Competition. The film was awarded the 2019 Champs Elysées Film Festival Prix du Jury, the 2019 Miami International Film Festival Knight Made in MIA Award, the 2019 Sidewalk Film Festival Documentary Jury honorable mention, the 2019 Montclair Film Festival Special Jury Prize for cinematography, and the Ashland Independent Film Festival Best Editing: Documentary Feature.

In 2021 Ivete served as co-director and editor of the documentary short film, Happiness is a Journey. The film follows warehouse workers packaging and delivering newspapers on Christmas Eve.

Filmography

References 

American women documentary filmmakers
People from São Paulo
1983 births
Living people